Los 15 Grandes Exitos de Juan Gabriel is a compilation album released by Juan Gabriel in 1982 and re-released on July 27, 2004.

Tracklistng

References 

1982 compilation albums
Juan Gabriel compilation albums